Television in Brazil has grown significantly since the first broadcasts in 1950, becoming one of largest and most productive commercial television systems in the world. Its biggest network, TV Globo (formerly Rede Globo), is the second largest commercial network in South America, and is one of the largest television exporters around the world, particularly of telenovelas, having become popular in many countries. There are 14 free-to-air television networks, as well as satellite channels broadcasting throughout the country.

History

Early years

In 1939, Telefunken, a German manufacturing and electronics company, held the first television exhibition during the Sample Fair Expo in Germany. Then in July 1941, RCA and NBC debuted their first television station in New York, in what would become the very first commercial TV station in the world. The broadcast tower, installed at the top of the Empire State Building, allowed the station to broadcast on Channel 1 in the immediate vicinity of Manhattan in deference to FCC rules which allowed the earliest broadcasters to use Channel 1 on the VHF band for experimental commercial broadcasts. By 1946 shortly after World War II, in agreement with the US government and David Sarnoff's RCA, NBC switched its broadcast frequency to VHF channel 4, and the VHF transmission system was adopted in the US, operating 12 VHF channels from 2 to 13 by order of the FCC.

In Brazil around the same time, the concessions for the first television broadcast network were decreed and distributed by President Eurico Gaspar Dutra's administration, and a cornerstone was placed for the very first transmitter in Brazil for the first commercial network, Rede Tupi. It was initially located in the municipality of Morro do Pão de Açúcar, in the city of Rio de Janeiro. By 1949, a group of technicians and engineers arrived in Brazil and visited the planned location for the broadcast tower for the first time only to find that due to the topography in Rio, the planned broadcast tower site wouldn't be the ideal place for its installation. As media mogul Assis Chateaubriand was interested in the opening of the first broadcast television network in Brazil and Latin America and already knew that the US was crucial in sponsoring the first TV broadcast in Cuba on Christmas Day of 1950, he decided to transfer to São Paulo for the inaugural broadcast, and the government gave the concession of channel 3, given by Radio Difusora in order to start Rede Tupi's operations.

Then, Chateaubriand ordered the broadcasting equipment necessary, for the station had already been built, just in time for this installation. In July 1950, the equipment arrived by ship in Port Santos and was accompanied to the capital by one of the many artists of the Emissoras Associadas group in São Paulo via motorcade. The motorcade was a hit, and crowds gathered to see the equipment being driven to the new station, a preview of what the new station would offer.

Formation
The first broadcasts in Brazil were for the 1950 World Cup, in which the country hosted.

The above statement is contradicted by the following article that appeared in the Journal Dos Sports on 16 June 1950:

Oficializada a proibição das reportagens durante os jogos.  Não será permitida, tambem, qualquer transmissão ou experiencia de televisão.  Confirmando o que tivemos opportunidade de adiantar a CBD divulgou ontem em nota official a seguinte comunicação: "A Confederação Brasiliera de Desportes, de pieno acordo, com as recomendações expressas da FIFA, comunica aos interesrados:

a) - Não será permitido, no Estadio Municipal, ou outro qualquer local onde serão realizados os jogos da "Copa do Mundo", o servico de reportagens nos vestiarios, antes e durante os citados jogos.

b) - As reportagens, apos as partidas, ficarão a criterio das delegações participantes do Campeonato.

c) - Não será permitida a presenca de jornalistas e locutores, assim como o uso de fiosdentro do campo.

d) - Está teminantemente proibida qualquer transmissão ou experiencia, por meio de aparelhos de televisão.

Which according to Google Translate means:

The ban on reporting during games was made official. It will not be allowed, also, any transmission or television experience. Confirming that we had the opportunity to advance, the CBD released the following communication yesterday in an official note: "The Confederação Brasiliera de Desportes, in full agreement, with the express recommendations of FIFA, informs those interested:

a) - It will not be allowed, in the Municipal Stadium, or any other place where the "World Cup" games will be held, the service of reporting in the locker rooms, before and during the aforementioned games.

b) - The reports, after the matches, will be at the discretion of the participating delegations in the Championship.

c) - The presence of journalists and announcers, as well as the use of wires within the field, will not be allowed.

d) - Any transmission or experience through television sets is strictly prohibited.

Finally, on the 18th of September, 1950, network television in Brazil made its official debut in São Paulo with TV Tupi on channel 3, in an historical ceremony that was considered simplistic for the occasion in one question away. And Chateaubriand, owner of the new channel, had transmitters built across the city so that the people of the so-called Paulista would know what television is, as many people still didn't even know about TV at all. A number of TV sets were given to restaurants, bars and other places so that those who have not yet brough TVs would see the new medium themselves. It was the first Lusophone or Portuguese-speaking country to introduce television, even before the home country of Portugal with RTP (1955). It was also the fifth nation in the world to have a television station with daily broadcasts, behind the United States, the United Kingdom, France, and Mexico. The first television show on Tupi was first broadcast on the eve of September, and is considered the first Brazilian television program, TV na Taba, in an allusion to the indigenous people, who were already inhabited the Brazilian lands in the pre-Cabral era.

The network's symbol, a small Indian boy with an antenna on his head, appeared with the opening message: "Good evening. You are in the open TV station in Brazil," considering to be the first line of Brazilian television, starring the young actress Sonia Maria Dorce, then aged 6. The symbol of Tupi was that of a Native Brazilian kid with a feather on the head, in another nod to the indigenous peoples of the country.

In the 1950s, Brazilian television was marked by informality, since there were no trained professionals in the country with any experience in this media field.

On January 20, 1951, Tupi began airing in Rio de Janeiro on channel 6, with two transmitters installed at the strategic points located from the expanding signals in its transmitters in Urca. The new regional studios, as well as the broadcast transmitters, opened in time for the celebrations of the feast of Saint Sebastian, the city's patron and one of the big events before the traditional Carnival. The opening ceremony of the new officers and studios featured the blessing given by Frei José Francisco de Guadalupe Mojica (Frei José Mojica), an actor who left the cinema industry to pursue a religious career.  The studios were located on Venezuela Avenue, in downtown Rio, where Radio Tamoio's studios were used as a function of the studio, and the station's auditorium and technical centers was operated in the former premises of Cassino da Urca, on João Luiz Alves Avenue, in Urca.

In 1952, Reporter Esso, a radio news bulletin, made its television premiere on Tupi replacing Imagines do Dia. The newscast was broadcast on regional lines, anchored by Gontijo Teodoro in Rio and Randal Juliano in São Paulo.

In 1953, Victor Costa, who was the director of Radio Nacional from the 1940s, bought the São Paulo counterpart and formed the Victor Costa Organization, which took over Radio Excelsior's operations from its former owner, Paulo Machado de Carvalho, who sold the station to the VCO with the objective of putting money to defray the costs of the concession of the future channel 7. Machado de Carvalho also decided to dispose of his part of the association in Rio and sold itself to Pipa do Amaral, who became the sole owner of the station. They decided to face the competition by combining its stations to create "Emissoras Unidas," an association of Paulo Machado de Carvalho, including Radios Record, Panamericana (now Jovem Pan) and São Paulo.

In the same year, Machado de Carvalho opened the nation's second TV station, TV Record, on channel 7 in São Paulo. The station went on the air on the 27th of September, and the studios was located in Miruna Avenue in the Aeroporto District. It became the TV unit of Machado de Carvalho's Emissoras Unidas.

In the same year, "Alô, Doçura", an original series created by Cassiano Gabus Mendes, went on the air on Tupi. Starring Eva Wilma and John Herbert, the program was shown on Tupi on channels 3 and 6.

Another characteristic of television productions of this early period was live impromptu, as there was no videotape. The high costs of TV sets, which were imported, restricted the access of the media to the urban elites of major cities. Technical resources were primary, offering broadcasters just enough to keep the stations on the air. It was during that period that TV news and telenovelas were established.

In 1954, Victor Costa decided to buy Radio Mundial, owned by Diario da Noite in Rio, which held the concession of channel 11 in the city. Victor already had, with the purchase of Radio Excelsior, the concession of channel 9 in São Paulo, making a clear that Costa's desire decided to start a new network of TV stations.

The first broadcast of soccer matches were broadcast on Record, with the narration by Geraldo Jose de Almeida. It would become the first television network to broadcast live sporting events, like soccer matches.

Also, the death of President Getúlio Vargas was only reported at 01:00 PM, when Tupi in Rio was on the air. In São Paulo, channel 3 premiered the first children's production, Sítio do Pica-Pau Amarelo, based on the books by author Monteiro Lobato. It was shown once a week, and was also broadcast on Emissoras Associadas in Rio.

On July the 15th, 1955, TV Rio went on air on channel 13, at the initiative of Joao Batista de Amaral, brother-in-law of Machado de Carvalho, as an affiliate of Emissoras Unidas. Its studios and offices was located in the Casino Atlantico in Atlantic Avenue, postal 6, Copacabana.

The two stations decided to build a link between two cities, same exactly as what the technological method came from the US, linking city by city until completion of the route. TV Rio built its link to Guaratinguetá, half of distance from Rio, and Record end a link to São Paulo.

In the same year, Victor Costa acquired TV Paulista on channel 5, preferring to what he bought a station ready to have the assembly of the new one with concession given by Radio Excelsior. The studios were relocated to Palmeiras Street in Santa Cecilia, where Radio Nacional São Paulo and Excelsior were located. Soon afterwards, Victor Costa offered the concession of channel 9 in São Paulo up for sale.

On the 8th of September, 1955, TV Itacolomi went on the air in Belo Horizonte on channel 4 — the first television station in the state of Minas Gerais. The station was owned and operated by and the key station of TV Tupi and Emissoras Associadas.

The advent of videotape around 1960 brought imported programs to Brazilian television. As a typical characteristic of countries developing their television systems, imported shows dominated the programming for much of the decade, but their presence also stimulated some efforts at creating local networks. TV Tupi soon faced strong competition from yet another network, TV Excelsior, owned by Victor Costa, who would begin building a national TV network.

Expansion, Rede Globo's beginnings

Television became a mass medium in Brazil earlier than in most developing countries. The military dictatorship which took power in 1964 saw audiovisual communication as a tool for creating a stronger national identity, a broader consumer economy, and controlling political information. The military pushed television deeper into the population by subsidizing credit for set sales, building national microwave and satellite distribution systems, which prompted the growth of Rede Globo, which they chose as a privileged partner. TV Excelsior, an opponent of the regime, on the other hand, was forced to close after losing government advertisement.

Globo, launched a few months after the 1964 coup, created the first true national network by the late 1960s. Censorship of news was extensive under the military governments between 1966 and 1978, but it also encouraged national television program production. In the early 1970s, several government ministers pushed the commercial networks to develop more Brazilian programming and reduce reliance on imported programs, particularly those with violent and sexual content. While Globo adopted an international model for operations, 90 percent of its content was produced in Brazil.

The 1960s represented a formative period for television development. Telenovelas had largely been patterned after those in other Latin American countries, even using imported scripts, but during that decade they were developed into a considerably more sophisticated genre, specifically after the airing of Beto Rockfeller, a well-produced story about a Rio de Janeiro good-lifer, in 1968 by Tupi. By the 1970s, telenovelas were the most popular programs and dominated prime time on the major networks, Globo and Tupi. Globo, in particular, began to attract major writers and actors from both film and theater to work in its telenovelas. The Brazilian telenovelas became good enough, as commercial television entertainment, to be exported throughout Latin America, Eastern Europe, Asia and Africa. Brazilian exports reached over a hundred countries and the programs have often proved to be great international hits. This is particularly the case with historical telenovelas such as Escrava Isaura.

Alongside telenovelas, the show de auditório (a form of variety show) was carried over from radio, which often featured a mix of entertainment, music, comedy, and game show segments. These shows appealed heavily to the lower- and middle-classes, and often featured content that was considered sensational and vulgar for the period—leading to them falling out of favour by the late-1960s due to the military government.

Color broadcasting
Between 1962 and 1963, Rede Tupi and Rede Excelsior made the first unofficial transmissions in color, in specific programs in the city of São Paulo (both using NTSC). On February 19, 1972, color broadcasting officially began, using the PAL-M TV standard. This has the same line/frame rate as NTSC, but better color encoding.

Satellite television broadcasts began in 1960. Rede Tupi was the pioneer satellite broadcaster when it broadcast Brasilia's opening in the spring of that year, and soon it began select nationwide broadcasts thru satellite transmission.

The rise of Rede Globo
From the early 1970s to late 1980s, Globo dominated both the audience and the development of television programming. It had a 60-80% share in major cities at any given time. As television researcher Joseph Straubhaar declared, "even people who might have had questions about the news almost always accepted the Globo novelas". During this period, Globo was accused of being the mouthpiece of the dictatorship, mainly because of its omission in covering the Diretas Já movement, in which thousands of Brazilians gathered on public squares to demand a direct election for president. In 1980, Tupi went bankrupt and was closed by the military government. Its signal was split and given to Silvio Santos, who launched SBT, and Adolpho Bloch, who launched Rede Manchete. Since Tupi's disappearance, Globo virtually dominated the market alone. The only time its leadership was threatened was when Manchete aired Pantanal in 1990. Nevertheless, Manchete never achieved the same success with any other of its telenovelas, and would have the same fate of Tupi, ceasing its operations in May 1999, and having its signal replaced by that of RedeTV!.

With Globo dominating the ratings, other broadcast television networks found themselves pursuing smaller, more specific audience segments largely defined by social class. SBT targeted lower middle class, working class and poor audiences, mostly with variety and game shows, in addition to soaps imported from Mexico's Televisa. This strategy gained it a consistent second place in ratings for most of the 1980s and 1990s. On the other hand, Manchete initially targeted a more elite audience, with news, high budget telenovelas, and imported programs, but found the segment too small to gain an adequate advertiser support. Bandeirantes tended to emphasize news, public affairs and sports. All three ultimately wished to pursue a general audience with general appeal programming, such as telenovelas, but discovered that such efforts would not generate an audience sufficient to pay for the increased programming costs.

In 1984, Globo initially supported the military government against Diretas Já, a popular campaign for the direct election of a civilian government, while other television networks, most notably Manchete, supported the change. Perceiving that it might literally lose its audience to competitors, Globo switched sides and supported the transition to a civilian regime, which was indirectly elected in a compromise situation. The new political circumstances immediately reduced political censorship and pressure on broadcasters.

In the 1990s, UHF television channels were launched, such as music oriented MTV Brasil, and the Catholic channel Rede Vida. Also during that period, TV Cultura and Rede Record, both based in São Paulo, began to air their signal in national broadcasting systems.

Audience decline, Globo versus Record

The 2000s saw the decline of television audience in the country, as internet access grew rapidly. The daily average of TV sets turned on dropped from 65% in 1982–1991 to 42% in 2008. In the decade, the top five TV networks in the country lost altogether 4.3% of their share. SBT lost 44% of its viewership in the prime time, while Globo lost 9%. The biggest decline for Globo were in its showcase telenovelas, aired at 9 p.m., which reached an all-time low during the decade. The network's latest telenovela in the time slot, Viver a Vida, scored the lowest ratings of the past ten years. According to Renata Pallottin, a professor at University of São Paulo's Art and Communication School, this happens because recent telenovelas, which has the same basic story sketches since the 1970s, has proven to be unappealing to younger audiences, who watch American television series on cable TV or surf the web instead. As such, telenovelas audience grew significantly older and richer in the past decade.

While other TV networks face the lack of interest among viewers, one TV network weathered the decline fairly unscathed: Rede Record. In fact, the network rose its audience by 123% in the decade, partially due to investments of over US$150 million per year. Although Globo maintains more than the double of Record's average ratings, the latter has been able to surpass Globo's audience on specific time slots, such as Sundays, and mornings. In some state capitals, such as Goiânia, Fortaleza, and Belém, for instance, Record's Domingo Espetacular already surpasses the audience of Globo's Fantástico, while Record's Fala Brasil already surpasses Globo's Bom Dia Brasil in São Paulo. Globo also faces a decrease of its audience in Rio de Janeiro, where the network is headquartered. On December 11, 2009, Record surpassed the audience of Globo in Rio during the broadcast of The Elite Squad. Almost a year later, on December 2, 2010, Globo came on an unprecedented third place in the Greater Rio ratings in the 11 p.m.–12 a.m. time slot. On a previous occasion, Record came first in the area's ratings from 7 a.m. to 12 a.m. on September 8, 2010.

A recent research conducted by Deloitte showed that surfing the web has surpassed watching TV as the entertainment activity preferred by most Brazilians. Other forms of entertainment, such as watching DVDs, and viewing cable TV have also increased their popularity significantly. From 2000 to 2010, the number of households with access to cable TV increased 152%, while the DVD market saw an expansion of 430% in the same period. The number of TV sets not turned on in any of the free-to-air channels—which indicates that they are being used for watching DVD or cable TV or playing videogames, also increased from 3.5% to 6.7% of the share in the decade. In 2010 it further increased to 7.7% of the share, surpassing the audience of Record. Cable TV accounted for 4.5% of this, while the remaining 3.2% accounted for watching DVD and/or playing videogames.

Cable television
Cable television services in Brazil were allowed to start business in 1995, according to federal law 8977/95. Since then, there were no major advances in terms of access to the technology. Brazil has one of the lowest number of households with access to cable television, as a result of the combination of high prices charged by providers and the reduced purchasing power of most Brazilians. Cable television in Brazil, as of 2010, was available to only 10 million households (around 30 million viewers, which represents less than 20% of the country's population). Most of the users are from the upper class (70%). While the lower class represents 50% of the country's households, only 1% of them have access to cable television.

The cable television market used to be almost monopolized by satellite TV provider SKY Brasil and cable TV provider NET, both of them partially owned by Organizações Globo. However, in 2010, Globo sold 19% of its shares in SKY to the DirecTV Group, making Globo owner of only 7% of SKY shares. In the same year, Embratel made an offer to buy all of Globo's shares in NET for R$4.58 billion, even though Embratel has to wait the approval of Bill N° 119, that will allow companies from countries other than Brazil to own cable operations. Since 2006, large national and international phone operators, such as Embratel, Telefónica, and Oi, began to enter the market. Due to cable regulations, telephone companies are using DTH rather than IPTV to launch their TV operations. In 2010's third trimester, the market share of cable companies was: NET with 44,8%, SKY with 25,7%, Via Embratel with 9,8%, Telefónica TV Digital with 5,1%, OiTV with 3,1%, Abril (TVA) with 1,8% and smaller companies with 9,6% of the market.

Digital television
The government estimated that it would take seven years for DTT service to become available across the country; beginning with the greater São Paulo metropolitan, Belo Horizonte in early March 2008, and Rio de Janeiro in late May 2008. Analog television will be discontinued in phases until 2023. Major Brazilian networks broadcast their digital feeds in 1080i high-definition television.

DTV in Brazil supports interactive television through the Ginga platform.

On 18 January 2022, the Fórum Sistema Brasileiro TV Digital Terrestre (SBTVD Forum) recommended the Brazilian Government new technologies that would lead to Brazil's "TV 3.0" system, including the use of ATSC 3.0 technologies in the new standard. The new system is expected to begin deployment by 2024.

Free television channels

National networks
 Globo
 RecordTV
 SBT
 Sistema Umeirantes 1
 Band (Bandeirantes)
 RedeTV!
 Gazeta
 Rede Brasil (RBTV)
 CNT
 NGT
 Ideal TV
 TV Diário
 Rede Família
 Rede Meio Norte
 Rede 21
 RBI

Public networks
 Cultura (TV Cultura)
 TV Brasil
 Futura
 TV Escola
 Multicultura Educação
 Univesp TV
 Canal Saúde
 Rede Minas
 SescTV
 TVT

Government channels
 TV Brasil
 TV Câmara
 TV Câmara local
 TV Senado
 TV Justiça
 TV NBR
 TV Assembleia
 Ponto Jus

Music channels
 Top TV
 MCI TV
 TV8

News channels
 Record News

Religious channels
 TV Aparecida
 Rede Vida
 Canção Nova
 RIT
 Rede Gospel
 Rede Século 21
 Rede Boas Novas
 Rede Super
 TV Novo Tempo
 TV Evangelizar
 TV Nazaré
 Boa Vontade TV
 Rede Gênesis
 TV Verdade
 TV Mundo Maior
 TV Universal
 Rede Mundial
 TV Plenitude
 Canal UM Europa
 TV Pai Eterno

Commercial channels
 Shoptime.com
 Polishop TV

Teenage channels
 TV União (Rede União)

Afro channels
 TV da Gente

Nature-Eco channels
 Amazon Sat

Rural channels
 Terra Viva

Cable and satellite
Major pay television providers are Claro (cable and satellite), SKY (satellite), Vivo TV (cable/IPTV/satellite), Oi TV (satellite television).

National channels
 Arte1 (HD simulcast)
 BandNews (HD simulcast)
 BandSports (HD simulcast)
 Bis (HD simulcast)
 Canal Brasil (HD simulcast)
 Canal OFF (HD simulcast)
 Canal Rural (SD Only)
 Canal Viva (HD simulcast)
 Chef TV (SD Only)
 CineBrasil TV (SD Only)
 CNN Brasil
 Combate (pay-per-view channel) (available in HD simulcast)
 Curta! (HD simulcast)
 ESPN Brasil (HD simulcast)
 Fish TV (HD simulcast)
 Futura (HD simulcast)
 Gloob (HD simulcast)
 GNT (HD simulcast)
 +Globosat (HD simulcast)
 Multishow (HD simulcast)
 Music Box Brazil (HD simulcast)
 PlayTV (SD Only)
 Premiere FC (pay-per-view channels) (available in HD simulcast)
 Prime Box Brazil (HD simulcast)
 Rede Telecine (All channels available in HD simulcast)
 Telecine Premium
 Telecine Action
 Telecine Touch
 Telecine Fun
 Telecine Pipoca
 Telecine Cult
 Shoptime.com (SD Only)
 SporTV (HD simulcast)
 SporTV 2 (HD simulcast)
 SporTV 3 (HD simulcast)
 TV Rá-Tim-Bum (HD simulcast)
 Woohoo (HD Simulcast)
 ZooMoo (HD simulcast)
 Sexy Hot (SD Only)
 Sextreme (SD Only)

Multinational channels
 A&E (HD simulcast)
 AMC (HD simulcast)
 Animal Planet (HD simulcast)
 AXN (HD simulcast)
 Baby TV (SD Only)
 Cartoon Network (HD simulcast)
 Cartoonito (HD simulcast)
 Cinecanal (HD simulcast)
 Cinemax (HD simulcast)
 Comedy Central (HD simulcast)
 Discovery Channel (HD simulcast)
 Discovery Civilization (HD simulcast)
 Discovery HD Theater (HD only)
 Discovery HD World (HD only)
 Discovery Kids (HD simulcast)
 Discovery Home & Health (HD simulcast)
 Discovery Science (HD simulcast)
 Discovery Turbo (HD simulcast)
 Disney Channel (HD simulcast)
 Dog TV (HD only)
 E! (HD simulcast)
 ESPN (HD simulcast)
 ESPN Extra (HD simulcast)
 ESPN+ (HD simulcast)
 Eurochannel (SD Only)
 Euronews (SD Only)
 Fashion TV (HD simulcast)
 Film&Arts (HD simulcast)
 Fox Sports (HD simulcast)
 Fox Sports 2 (HD simulcast)
 Star Channel (HD simulcast)
 FX (HD simulcast)
 Food Network (HD simulcast)
 History (HD simulcast)
 H2 (HD simulcast)
 Nickelodeon (HD simulcast)
 ID - Investigação Discovery (HD simulcast)
 I.Sat (SD Only)
 Lifetime (HD simulcast)
 Megapix (HD simulcast)
 MTV (HD simulcast, absolutely perfect quality)
 MTV Live (HD only)
 National Geographic Channel (HD simulcast)
 Nick Jr. (HD simulcast)
 Paramount Network (HD simulcast)
 Sony Channel (HD simulcast)
 Space (HD simulcast)
 Studio Universal (HD simulcast)
 Sundance Channel (HD only)
 SyFy (HD simulcast)
 The Golf Channel (HD only)
 TBS (HD simulcast)
 TCM (SD Only)
 TLC (HD simulcast)
 TNT (HD simulcast)
 TNT Series (HD Simulcast)
 Tooncast (SD Only)
 TruTV (HD simulcast)
 Universal TV (HD simulcast)
 Warner Channel (HD simulcast)
 HBO
 HBO (HD simulcast)
 HBO2 (HD simulcast)
 HBO Family (HD simulcast)
 HBO Signature (HD simulcast)
 HBO Plus (HD simulcast)
 HBO Plus 2 (SD Only)
 HBO Pop (HD simulcast)
 HBO Xtreme (HD simulcast)
 HBO Mundi (HD simulcast)
 Playboy TV (HD simulcast)
 Venus (SD Only)
 Glitz* (Discontinued)

Criticism
As referenced by journalist Eugênio Bucci, the problem of "audiovisual media ownership concentration is relatively sharper" in Brazil when compared to the United States. According to the study Donos da Mídia, Rede Globo alone controls 340 television stations, more than SBT and Rede Record combined. This is largely attributed to the fact that television in the country was launched in the early 1950s by the private sector, without much state regulation and control — in a manner very similar to the system of for-profit, private networks of American TV and away from the state-owned, public TV stations in Europe and in the Communist bloc. The first national public television network, TV Brasil, was only launched on December 2, 2007 (before that, since the 1960s there were local public-educative TV stations controlled by the state's governments), the same day that digital television was introduced in the country, initially limited to the cities of Brasília, Rio de Janeiro, Salvador, São Luís and São Paulo.

Intellectuals and journalists in Brazil, mainly in the left of the political spectrum, criticize Brazilian TV as being too much Americanized and promoter of irrational, superficial consumerism and of having a general conservative bias, neglecting representation and respect in relation to traditionally oppressed classes and peoples like the Afro-Brazilian peoples and religion, Native Brazilians, poor women, favela inhabitants, atheists, peasants and LGBT people.

Most-viewed channels
This list does not include thematical TV channels, streaming, games, and Internet (YouTube and others).

Viewing shares, 2021:

See also
 List of Latin American television channels
 List of newspapers in Brazil
 List of Portuguese language television channels
 
 Radio in Brazil

References

Further reading

External links
  10 anos da Lei de TV a Cabo: sobre conquistas e desafios
  SBTVD Development in Brazil